The takshita (Berber: ⵜⴽⵛⵉⵟⴰ ; , alternate spellings: taqchita, tackshita, tackchita) is a Moroccan traditional women's garment that, like the Moroccan Kaftan, is worn for celebrations, particularly weddings. It is composed of two pieces, a dress as a first layer called "Tahtia", often of fine but not ornately decorated fabric, and a more elaborate second layer or over-dress that often buttons up the front using the traditional sfifa and akaad closures and it is called "Dfina". The upper layer is often richly adorned with embroidery, beading or sequins.

Modern interpretations of traditional Moroccan clothing, particularly the Takchita, Caftan and Jellaba are exhibited at the annual Caftan fashion show in Morocco and hosted by the Moroccan fashion magazine Femmes du Maroc.

See also 
 Jellaba
 Jellabiya

References and notes 

Moroccan Caftan or Tekchita worn by the Royal Family:  
Learn how to make a Caftan or Tekchita: 

Moroccan clothing
Folk costumes